Jean-Claude Vuithier Sr. (born 19 January 1951) is a Swiss sailor. He competed at the 1976 Summer Olympics and the 1980 Summer Olympics.

References

External links
 

1951 births
Living people
Swiss male sailors (sport)
Olympic sailors of Switzerland
Sailors at the 1976 Summer Olympics – 470
Sailors at the 1980 Summer Olympics – Star
Place of birth missing (living people)